Ekalavyan is a 1993 Indian Malayalam-language neo-noir action thriller film directed by Shaji Kailas and written by Renji Panicker, starring Suresh Gopi in the lead role along with Siddique, Geetha, Narendra Prasad, Vijayaraghavan, Ganesh Kumar, Janardhanan, Madhu, Maathu, Jagathy Sreekumar, Kuthiravattam Pappu, and Devan in other pivotal roles. 

The film was a blockbuster and ran for more than 100 days in theatres. With consecutive box office hits from The News, Thalastaanam, Mafia and Ekalavyan, Suresh Gopi was catapulted to the status of a matinée idol. After the success of the 1994 blockbuster Commissioner in Andhra Pradesh, Ekalavyan was dubbed in Telugu and released as CBI Officer which also became a commercial success. The film is said to be an inspiration for the 2014 Hindi film Singham Returns.

Plot
Swami Amoorthananda is a psychotic holy godman with strong international connections and also runs a powerful narcotics mafia in Kerala. He also has several connections within political circles and is also a good orator, where he draws many devotees from abroad and makes them to slowly turn into addicts.

A series of murders at Kovalam beach invites sharp criticism of the Kerala Government and the C.M Sreedharan decides to bring Narcotics Wing Madhavan IPS to investigate the case. Arriving in Kerala from New Delhi and assisted by a smart C.I Sharath Chandran, Madhavan's aggressive way of investigation leads him to Amoorthananda's ashram, which creates a panic in the state. Amoorthananda decides to eliminate Madhavan and also plans to topple Sreedharan by appointing his aide Velayudhan as the new C.M. 

Upon the orders from Amoorthananda, Mahesh Nair, a notorious terrorist arrives in Kerala, where he kills Sharath Chandran, which forces Madhavan to react violently and raids the ashram and botches Amoorthananda's plot to cause a series of bomb blasts in the state. Madhavan also kills Amoorthananda and Mahesh Nair, thus saving the state from a series of blasts and communal riots.

Cast

Production

Filming 
The film was shot mostly in and around Trivandrum and Kovalam. A large part was also shot in Kozhikode. It was produced by P. V. Gangadharan for Grihalakshmi Productions. The camera was done by Ravi K. Chandran and editing by L. Bhoominathan. Rajamani did the background score, and Boban was the art director.

Casting
Initially, Shaji Kailas and scriptwriter Renji Panicker had planned to rope in Mammootty to do the lead role in this flick, while Suresh Gopi was also part of the initial star cast, but his role was that of the second hero. After hearing the script, Mammootty told Shaji Kailas that he is not impressed with the dialogues. Due to this, Shaji Kailas decided to start the film with Suresh Gopi in the lead, and the originally planned role for Suresh was later given to Siddique.

Box office
Ekalavyan became a commercial success and ran for 200 days in theatres. The film shattered many collection records and elevated Suresh Gopi to the status of the matinée idol and the second action superstar ever in Malayalam cinema after Jayan. It also helped him to fetch more action-oriented roles. 

After the success of the original version along with Telugu and Tamil versions of Commissioner, the Telugu and Tamil versions of the film  Ekalavyan which was actually released before Commissioner hit the theaters under the title CBI Officer. The movie had earned Suresh Gopi the title of Supreme Star in Andhra Pradesh.

Legacy
 Ekalavyan was the second in a trilogy of films that established Suresh Gopi as the new superstar in the Malayalam film industry, the other two being Thalastaanam and Mafia.
 Suresh Gopi reprised his role of Madhavan IPS in 1995 blockbuster The King starring Mammootty and also written and directed by Shaji Kailas-Renji Panicker.

Remake
This movie was remade in Hindi as Singham Returns (2014) starring Ajay Devgn, Kareena Kapoor, Anupam Kher, Amole Gupte and Zakir Hussain.

References

External links
 

1990s Malayalam-language films
1993 action thriller films
1993 films
Films directed by Shaji Kailas
Films shot in Kozhikode
Films shot in Thiruvananthapuram
Fictional portrayals of the Kerala Police
Malayalam films remade in other languages
Indian action thriller films